Edin is a predominantly Bosnian masculine given name of Aramaic and Semitic origin. It was brought to the Balkans by the Ottoman Turks and it became a prevalent boys' name.
Notable persons with that name include:

Persons with the given name
 Edin Dervishalidovic, Bosnian Musician and songwriter. 
 Edin Ademović (born 1987), Bosnian footballer
 Edin Cornelius Alfsen (1896–1966), Norwegian missionary
 Edin Atić (born 1997), Bosnian footballer
 Edin Bahtić (born 1956), Bosnian footballer
 Edin Bašić (born 1979), Bosnian footballer
 Edin Bavčić (born 1984), Bosnian basketball player
 Edin Cocalić (botn 1987), Bosnian footballer
 Edin Ćurić (born 1962), Bosnian footballer
 Edin Ćeranić (born 1999), Montenegrin painter
 Edin Dervišhalidović (born 1962), Bosnian singer
 Edin Džeko (born 1986), Bosnian footballer
 Edin Ferizović (born 1977), Serbian footballer
 Edin Forto (born 1972), Bosnian footballer
 Edin Hamidović (born 1993), Swedish footballer
 Edin Husić (born 1985), Bosnian footballer
 Edin Ibrahimović (born 1998), Austrian volleyball player
 Edin Julardžija (born 2001), Croatian footballer
 Edin Junuzović (born 1986), Croatian footballer
 Edin Karamazov (born 1965), Bosnian musician
 Edin Krupalija (born 1977), Bosnian bobsledder
 Edin Mujčin (born 1970), Bosnian footballer
 Edin Nuredinoski (born 1982), Macedonian footballer
 Edin Osmanović (born 1964), Slovenian footballer and football manager
 Edin Osmić (born 1978), Bosnian rapper
 Edin Øy (born 1997), Norwegian footballer
 Edin Pehlić (born 1984), Bosnian footballer
 Edin Pepić (born 1991), German footballer
 Edin Prljača (born 1971), Bosnian footballer and football manager
 Edin Rustemović (born 1993), Bosnian footballer
 Edin Salkić (born 1989), Austrian footballer
 Edin Šaranović (born 1976), Bosnian footballer
 Edin Šehić (born 1995), Bosnian footballer
 Edin Selimović (born 1991), Serbian footballer
 Edin Škorić (born 1975), Serbian volleyball player
 Edin Sprečo (born 1947), Bosnian footballer
 Edin Terzić (disambiguation), several persons
 Edin Velez, Puerto Rican video artist, director and professor
 Edin Višća (born 1990), Bosnian footballer
 Edin Chavez Mexican American photographer

Persons with the surname
 Johan Edin (born 1987), Swedish skier
 Kathryn Edin, American sociologist
 Niklas Edin (born 1985), Swedish curler
 Salah Edin (born 1980), Dutch-Moroccan rapper

Bosnian masculine given names
Masculine given names